The 1989–1993 Bolivian National Congress was a meeting of the Bolivian legislature composed of the Chamber of Senators and Chamber of Deputies. It met in La Paz from 6 August 1989 to 6 August 1993 during the presidency of Jaime Paz Zamora.

The Congress was elected as part of the general elections on 7 May 1989.

Congressional presidential ballot 
As no candidate reached the required popular vote majority, the newly elected Congress elected the president on 6 August.

Jaime Paz Zamora of the Revolutionary Left Movement (MIR) was elected with the support of the Nationalist Democratic Action (ADN) and Conscience of Fatherland (CONDEPA). Gonzalo Sánchez de Lozada of the Revolutionary Nationalist Movement (MNR) received only the support of his own party. The United Left (IU) abstained. In exchange for the support of the ADN, the MIR agreed to elect Luis Ossio of the Christian Democratic Party (PDC) as vice president rather than Paz Zamora's running mate Gustavo Fernández Saavedra.

Leadership

National Congress 

 President: Luis Ossio (PDC), from 6 August 1989

Chamber of Senators 

 President: Gonzalo Valda Cárdenas (MIR), until 6 August 1991
 Guillermo Fortún Suárez (ADN), from 6 August 1991

Chamber of Deputies 

 President: Fernando Kieffer Guzmán (ADN), until 6 August 1991
 Gastón Encinas Valverde (MIR), from 6 August 1991

Composition

Chamber of Senators 
1989–1993 members of the Chamber of Senators:

Chamber of Deputies 
1989–1993 members of the Chamber of Deputies:

Notes

References

Political history of Bolivia
Members of the Plurinational Legislative Assembly